Wheeler Hall is a building on the campus of the University of California, Berkeley in Berkeley, California in the Classical Revival style.  Home to the English department, it was named for the philologist and university president Benjamin Ide Wheeler.

The building was opened in 1917. It houses the largest lecture hall on the Berkeley campus, Wheeler Auditorium.

On February 29, 1940, UC Berkeley professor Ernest O. Lawrence received the Nobel Prize in Physics in Wheeler Auditorium from Carl Wallerstedt, Consul General from Sweden, due to the danger of crossing the Atlantic during World War II. The building was the site of many of the Free Speech Movement protests in the 1960s and is a focal point of the Berkeley campus. In the 2010s, it has been the place for many university protests and several building takeovers.

Footnotes

External links

 Interactive Map of Berkeley Campus

School buildings on the National Register of Historic Places in California
Buildings and structures in Berkeley, California
University of California, Berkeley buildings
University and college academic buildings in the United States
1917 establishments in California
History of Berkeley, California
National Register of Historic Places in Berkeley, California